Deane is a village and civil parish in the county of Hampshire, England. Its name appears in the name of the borough in which it is placed, Basingstoke and Deane.

Governance
The village is a civil parish and part of the Oakley and North Waltham ward of Basingstoke and Deane borough council. The borough council is a Non-metropolitan district of Hampshire County Council.

Geography
The parish is surrounded by other Hampshire parishes, with Kingsclere north, Hannington north east, Oakley east, Dummer south east, North Waltham south, Steventon south west and Overton north west.

See also
 List of places in Hampshire

Further reading
 Deane, a brief history of the village

References

External links

Villages in Hampshire
Civil parishes in Basingstoke and Deane